Diego Torres Altamirano, O.F.M. (1557–1621) was a Roman Catholic prelate who served as Bishop of Cartagena in Colombia (1618–1621).

Biography
Diego Torres Altamirano was born in Trujillo, Spain and ordained a priest in the Order of Friars Minor.
On 26 Jun 1617, he was appointed during the papacy of Pope Paul V as Bishop of Cartagena in Colombia.
On 28 Oct 1618, he was consecrated bishop by Bartolomé Lobo Guerrero, Archbishop of Lima. 
He served as Bishop of Cartagena in Colombia until his death on 10 Dec 1621.

While bishop, he was the principal consecrator of Ambrosio Vallejo Mejia, Bishop of Popayán (1620) .

References

External links and additional sources
 (for Chronology of Bishops) 
 (for Chronology of Bishops) 

17th-century Roman Catholic bishops in New Granada
Bishops appointed by Pope Paul V
Roman Catholic bishops of Cartagena in Colombia
1557 births
1621 deaths
People from the Province of Cáceres
Franciscan bishops